Kent Lawrence (June 3, 1947 – March 13, 2020) was an American football wide receiver. He played for the Philadelphia Eagles in 1969 and for the Atlanta Falcons in 1970.

He died on March 13, 2020, in Athens, Georgia at age 72.

References

1947 births
2020 deaths
American football wide receivers
Georgia Bulldogs football players
Philadelphia Eagles players
Atlanta Falcons players